Revheim Church is a parish church of the Church of Norway in the southern part of the large Stavanger Municipality in Rogaland county, Norway. It is located in village of Kvernevik in the borough of Madla in the western part of the city of Stavanger. It is the church for the Hafrsfjord parish which is part of the Ytre Stavanger prosti (deanery) in the Diocese of Stavanger. The white, wooden church was built in a long church design in 1864 using designs by the architect Hans Linstow. The church seats about 300 people.

See also
List of churches in Rogaland

References

Churches in Stavanger
Wooden churches in Norway
19th-century Church of Norway church buildings
Churches completed in 1864
1864 establishments in Norway